= Batrachus =

Ancient Greek sculptor

Batrachus (Ancient Greek: Βάτραχος) was said to have been a Spartan sculptor and architect of the time of Roman emperor Augustus.

The writer Pliny the Elder relates that Batrachus and Sauras ("Frog" and "Lizard"), who were both very rich, built at their own expense two temples in Rome, one to Jupiter and the other to Juno, hoping they would be allowed to put their names in the inscription of the temples. But being denied this, they made the figures of a frog and a lizard in the convolutions of the Ionic capitals.

That this tale is a mere fable founded on nothing but the appearance of the two figures on the columns, scarcely needs to be remarked.
